Susan Powter (born 22 December 1957) is an Australian-born American motivational speaker, nutritionist, personal trainer, and author, who rose to fame in the 1990s with her catchphrase "Stop the Insanity!", the centerpiece of her weight-loss infomercial.

She hosted her own talk show The Susan Powter Show in the 1990s.

Early life 
Born in Sydney in 1957 (some sources give her birthdate as 12 December and others as 22 December), Powter emigrated to the United States at age 10. She left school in 9th grade.

Career

Television 
In 1994, Powter starred in her own talk-show style television program called The Susan Powter Show, which ran for one season. On the show, she discussed nutrition and fitness as well as other topics with her guests. She was also a special guest on the first episode of Space Ghost Coast to Coast, titled "Spanish Translation".

It was planned for her to be a regular on the TV sitcom Women of the House in 1995. The series was cancelled before the single episode she appeared in was shown on TV.

Motivational speaker and nutritionist 
Advocate of a whole-foods, organic, low-fat diet, and regular cardiovascular and strength-training exercise, Powter also condemned the diet industry.

Her platinum-white close cropped haircut, aggressive speaking manner, and habit of being barefoot while speaking in public became elements of her celebrity. She has since grown out her hair and has multiple tattoos.

Powter was originally based in Dallas, Texas, at the height of her fame. She eventually sold her studio in Dallas and moved to Seattle, Washington. In 2012, she was living in an Earthship in New Mexico. More recently, she lived in Las Vegas, NM.

Author and blogger 
Powter is an author of several books, three of which became New York Times best-sellers in the 1990s. In 2002, she returned to writing with The Politics of Stupid, a stream-of-consciousness, self-published manifesto encouraging women to take control of their brains and bodies from food manufacturers, corrupt governments, and fitness/diet industries. She puts out The Monthly Flow, a subscription-based multi-media e-zine.

Personal life 
On 3 January 1995, Powter filed for personal bankruptcy.

Powter has been married twice. She has two sons from her first marriage, Damien and Kiel. She adopted a third son Gabriel, after her second marriage. She later came out as a lesbian, and in a 2004 interview with Curve magazine, she described herself as a "radical feminist lesbian woman". She dated comedian Jessica Kirson in 2008.

Bibliography 
 Stop the Insanity! (1993) 
 The Pocket Powter (1994) 
 Food (1995) 
 C'mon America, Let's Eat (1996)
 Sober…and Staying That Way: The Missing Link in the Cure for Alcoholism (1997)
 Hey, Mom! I'm Hungry!: Great-Tasting, Low-Fat, Easy Recipes to Feed Your Family (1997)
 The Politics of Stupid (2002)

Video cassettes
Moving With Susan (1992)
Shopping with Susan (1993)
Lean, Strong and Healthy with Susan Powter (1993)
Building Strength with Susan Powter (1994)
Burn Fat & Get Fit with Susan Powter (1994)

References

External links 
 Susan Powter Official Website
 
 

1957 births
Living people
Australian exercise and fitness writers
Australian exercise instructors
Australian feminist writers
Australian health and wellness writers
Australian motivational speakers
Australian motivational writers
Women motivational writers
Australian LGBT writers
Australian LGBT actors
American feminists
American lesbian writers
American television actresses
American television talk show hosts
American LGBT broadcasters
21st-century American women writers